Valea Groșilor River may refer to:
Valea Groșilor, a tributary of the Molivișu in Alba County
Valea Groșilor, a tributary of the Sadu in Sibiu County